Michel Louis Christophe Roch Gilbert Motier, Marquis de La Fayette (13 August 1731 – 9 July 1759) was a colonel in the French Grenadiers.

Early life

Michel Louis Christophe Roch Gilbert was the son of Edouard Motier de La Fayette, the Lord of Champetières and Marquis de Vissac, and Marie Catherine de Suat, dame de Chavaniac.

The marquis title and Lord of Chavaniac passed to him from his elder brother, Jacques-Roch du Motier (1711–1734), upon his death on January 18, 1734 while fighting the Austrians at Milan in the War of Polish Succession.

Career
The Marquis de La Fayette was a colonel in the French Grenadiers and was a Knight of the Order of Saint Louis. During the Battle of Minden in the Seven Years' War, he was killed by a cannonball, while fighting a British-led coalition in Westphalia.

Personal life
 On 22 May 1754, he married Marie Louise Jolie de la Rivière (1737–1770), the daughter the Marquis de la Rivière, a rich nobleman from Brittany. She was a descendant of Louis IX and of Charlemagne. Her maternal grandfather was the Comte de La Rivière, until his death in 1770 commander of the Mousquetaires du Roi, or Black Musketeers, King Louis XV's personal horse guard. Together, they were the parents of a son who was born at the château de Chavaniac, in Chavaniac-Lafayette, near Le Puy-en-Velay, in the province of Auvergne (now Haute-Loire):

 Gilbert du Motier, Marquis de Lafayette (1757–1834), who played a significant role in the American and French Revolutions.

The year he died, his son, who was only two years old, then became marquis and Lord of Chavaniac, but the estate went to his widow. Perhaps devastated by the loss of her husband, she went to live in Paris with her father and grandfather, leaving their son to be raised in Chavaniac-Lafayette by his paternal grandmother, Mme de Chavaniac, who had brought the château into the family with her dowry.  His widow and her father died in 1770, leaving Michel's 12-year-old son orphaned.

Notes

References

External links
 Marquis de Lafayette papers, 1757-1990

1731 births
1759 deaths
French marquesses
French military personnel killed in the Seven Years' War
Gilbert du Motier, Marquis de Lafayette
Knights of the Order of Saint Louis